Blocher's Run is a Pennsylvania stream which flows from Oak Ridge (triple watershed point at ) on the Gettysburg Battlefield eastward to the Rock Creek through and near areas of the Battle of Gettysburg, First Day.

During the Battle of Gettysburg Confederate soldiers took cover behind the trees that lined the stream.

See also
List of rivers of Pennsylvania

References

Rivers of Adams County, Pennsylvania
Rivers of Pennsylvania
Tributaries of the Monocacy River